English through Actions is a book about the direct method of language education written by Harold E. Palmer and his daughter, Dorothee Palmer. It was first published in 1925 by the Japanese publisher Kaitakusha. The book includes various systematical materials for standard students, and helps teachers reduce preparation time.

Synopsis 
General Introduction
The Technique of Speech-Teaching
Notes concerning the Treatment of certain difficulties connected with Elementary English Grammar and Composition
Imperative Drill（Collective）
Imperative Drill（Individual）
Conventional Conversation
Free Oral Assimilation
Action Chains
List of Objects, Substances, Pictures, etc., recommended in connection with "English Through Actions"
The Names of the Pupils

References

Language textbooks
English-language education